Woodbine is an unincorporated community in Nicholas County, West Virginia, United States.

The community most likely was named for the woodbine growing near the original town site.

References

Unincorporated communities in Nicholas County, West Virginia
Unincorporated communities in West Virginia